Part Two, Part 2 or Part II may refer to:

Films and television
"Part 2" (Twin Peaks), also known as "The Return, Part 2", the second episode of the third season of the TV series Twin Peaks

Music
 Part Two (Throbbing Gristle album), 2007
 Part II (Brad Paisley album), 2001
 Part II (Lil Jon & the East Side Boyz album), 2003
 Part 2 (Brix & The Extricated album), 2017
 "Part II" (song), 2001 single by Method Man & Redman
 "Part II (On the Run)", 2014 single by Jay-Z and Beyoncé

Others
 Part II, a stage of the qualification process in the UK to become an architect

See also
 PT2 (disambiguation)